The Wheel of Life (Spanish: La rueda de la vida) is a 1942 Spanish film directed by Eusebio Fernández Ardavín.

Synopsis 
The singer Nina Luján falls in love with Alberto del Vall, a composer who became famous in America and the two meet again after years, when she has entered an asylum after failing in her artistic career.

Cast
Ismael Merlo as Alberto del Vall  
Antoñita Colomé as Nina Luján  
Gabriel Algara as Don Ricardo  
Pedro Barreto as Peter  
Eduardo Stern as Enrique  
Alfonso Mancheño as Federico  
Elisa Cavalcanti as Criada
Antonio Bayón as Don Rosendo  
Xan das Bolas as Juanito  
Salvador Videgaín
M. Romero Hita as Francisco  
Antonio Casas as Javier 
Esperanza Hidalgo as Trini 
Elena Salvador

Reception
The Wheel of Life was nominated for the best film of year in Spain, and was one of the five best films of the year.

References

External links

Spain in fiction
Films directed by Eusebio Fernández Ardavín
Films produced by Cesáreo González
Spanish black-and-white films
1940s Spanish films